The 2014–15 LNB Pro A season was the 93rd season of the French Basketball Championship and the 28th season since inception of the LNB.

The season started on September 26, 2014 and ended on June 20, 2015.

This season the number of teams was increased to 18, after SOMB Boulogne-sur-Mer and JL Bourg-en-Bresse promoted from the LNB Pro B and Champagne Châlons Reims Basket and SPO Rouen Basket were offered spots through a wild card.

Teams

Promotion and relegation
Relegated to Pro B
Chorale Roanne Basket (15th)
Antibes (16th)Promoted from Pro BSOMB Boulogne-sur-Mer (Champion)
JL Bourg-en-Bresse (Playoffs winner)Wild-cards offered by LNB''' 
Champagne Châlons Reims
SPO Rouen Basket

Venues and locations

Managerial changes

Before the start of the season

Regular season

League table

Results

Playoffs

Awards

All-Star Game

References

External links
  LNB website

LNB Pro A seasons
French
LNB Pro A